Eucosmophora atlantis is a moth of the family Gracillariidae. It is known from Costa Rica.

The length of the forewings is 3.6–4.5 mm for males and 4-4.8 mm. for females.

The larvae probably feed on a Sapotaceae species and probably mine the leaves of their host plant.

References

Acrocercopinae
Moths described in 1924